This article lists the squads of all participating teams in the 2021–22 FIH Pro League. The nine national teams involved in the tournament were required to register a squad of a minimum of 20 players who will take part in the competition.

Age, caps and club for each player are as of 16 October 2021, the first day of the season.

Argentina
The following is the Argentina squad for the 2021–22 FIH Pro League.

Head coach: Mariano Ronconi

Belgium
The following is the Belgium squad for the 2021–22 FIH Pro League.

Head coach:  Michel van den Heuvel

England
The following is the England squad for the 2021–22 FIH Pro League.

Head coach: Zak Jones

France
The following is the France squad for the 2021–22 FIH Pro League.

Head coach: Frederic Soyez

Germany
The following is the Germany squad for the 2021–22 FIH Pro League.

Head coach: Kais al Saadi

India
The following is the India squad for the 2021–22 FIH Pro League

Head coach:  Graham Reid

Netherlands
The following is the Netherlands squad for the 2021–22 FIH Pro League.

Head coach: Jeroen Delmee

South Africa
The following is the South Africa squad for the 2021–22 FIH Pro League.

Head coach: Garreth Ewing

Spain
The following is the Spain squad for the 2021–22 FIH Pro League.

Head coach: Max Caldas

References

Men's FIH Pro League squads